The Wall Street Historic District in New York City includes part of Wall Street and parts of nearby streets in the Financial District in lower Manhattan. It includes 65 contributing buildings and one contributing structure over a  listed area.

The historic district's street plan originated in the colonial era. It "reflects medieval European town patterns rather than the standard grid found throughout much of Manhattan, and together with the district's towering skyscrapers it creates the narrow 'canyons' for which the area is so famous."

Sites within the district
Within the historic district are 21 sites that are individually (i.e., separately) listed on the National Register of Historic Places (NRHP), as follows:

Bowling Green - also a New York City Landmark
Alexander Hamilton U.S. Custom House (1 Bowling Green) - also a New York City Landmark
New York Stock Exchange Building (8-18 Broad Street) - also a New York City Landmark
Broad Exchange Building (25 Broad Street) - also a New York City Landmark
Lee, Higginson & Company Bank Building (37–41 Broad Street)
American Bank Note Company Building (70 Broad Street) - also a New York City Landmark
International Mercantile Marine Company Building (1 Broadway) - also a New York City Landmark
Empire Building (71 Broadway) - also a New York City Landmark
Equitable Building (120 Broadway) - also a New York City Landmark
Trinity Church (Broadway and Wall Street) - also a New York City Landmark
Federal Reserve Bank of New York Building (33 Liberty Street) - also a New York City Landmark
Liberty Tower (55 Liberty Street) - also a New York City Landmark
New York Chamber of Commerce Building (65 Liberty Street) - also a New York City Landmark
Wallace Building (56 Pine Street) - also a New York City Landmark
American Stock Exchange Building (86 Trinity Place) - also a New York City Landmark
The House of Morgan (23 Wall Street) - also a New York City Landmark
Federal Hall National Memorial (26 Wall Street) - also a New York City Landmark
Bank of the Manhattan Company Building (40 Wall Street) - also a New York City Landmark
Bank of New York Building (48 Wall Street) - also a New York City Landmark
Merchants Exchange Building (55 Wall Street) - also a New York City Landmark
Wall and Hanover Building (63 Wall Street)

Two further buildings within the Wall Street Historic District are individually listed on the New York State Register of Historic Places, but not the NRHP. These are the Trinity Building (111 Broadway) and the U.S. Realty Company Building (115 Broadway). Both of these are also New York City Landmarks.

A number of additional buildings within the district are listed as landmarks by the New York City Landmarks Preservation Commission but not by the NRHP or New York State Register of Historic Places. These are: Delmonico's Building (56 Beaver Street), the Bowling Green Offices Building (11 Broadway), the Cunard Building (25 Broadway), the Standard Oil Building (26 Broadway), the American Express Building (65 Broadway), City Bank Farmers Trust Building (20 Exchange Place), 90 Maiden Lane, the Down Town Association (60 Pine Street), the Cocoa Exchange (1 Wall Street Court), the Irving Trust Company Building (1 Wall Street), the Bankers Trust Building (14 Wall Street), and the J. & W. Seligman & Co. Building (1 William Street). The district's street pattern is also a New York City Landmark.

References

Neoclassical architecture in New York City
Wall Street
Historic districts on the National Register of Historic Places in Manhattan
Historic districts in Lower Manhattan